Shetpal, or Shetphal, is a village in the Mohol taluka of Solapur district in Maharashtra state, India. According to Census 2011 information the location code or village code of Shetphal village is 562192. It is situated 24km away from sub-district headquarter Mohol (tehsildar office) and 69km away from district headquarter Solapur. As per 2009 stats, Shetphal village is also a gram panchayat. The total geographical area of village is 3089 hectares. Kurduvadi is nearest town to shetphal for all major economic activities, which is approximately 22km away.

It is a fact well-known that India is a country, where snakes are considered as revered creatures due to their ancient origin, and their connection with Hindu deity Shiva. Every year, on the Nag Panchami festival, thousands of devout people in Indian villages worship and feed the snakes to receive divine blessings.

However, about 200 km from Pune, Maharashtra, in the Sholapur district, is located a village named Shetpal.

Shetpal is a village, where snakes have no restriction in their movement and none of the 2,600 plus villagers ever harm them in any way.

Census

Years 2011
Shetphal is a large village located in Mohol Taluka of Solapur district, Maharashtra with total 1245 families residing. The Shetphal village has population of 5772 of which 3055 are males while 2717 are females.

In Shetphal village population of children with age 0-6 is 754 which makes up 13.06 % of total population of village. Average Sex Ratio of Shetphal village is 889 which is lower than Maharashtra state average of 929. Child Sex Ratio for the Shetphal as per census is 866, lower than Maharashtra average of 894.

Shetphal village has lower literacy rate compared to Maharashtra. In 2011, literacy rate of Shetphal village was 76.88 % compared to 82.34 % of Maharashtra. In Shetphal Male literacy stands at 85.55 % while female literacy rate was 67.17 %.

As per constitution of India and Panchyati Raaj Act, Shetphal village is administrated by Sarpanch (Head of Village) who is elected representative of village. Our website, don't have information about schools and hospital in Shetphal village.

Caste Data
Schedule Caste (SC) constitutes 14.40 % while Schedule Tribe (ST) were 0.29 % of total population in Shetphal village.

Working Population
In Shetphal village out of total population, 2683 were engaged in work activities. 97.02 % of workers describe their work as Main Work (Employment or Earning more than 6 Months) while 2.98 % were involved in Marginal activity providing livelihood for less than 6 months. Of 2683 workers engaged in Main Work, 1474 were cultivators (owner or co-owner) while 649 were Agricultural labourer.

Villages in Solapur district